Ectopsocus strauchi is a species of outer barklouse in the family Ectopsocidae. It is found in Africa, the Caribbean, Europe and Northern Asia (excluding China), North America, and South America.

References

Ectopsocidae
Articles created by Qbugbot
Insects described in 1906